Continuous delivery (CD) is a software engineering approach in which teams produce software in short cycles, ensuring that the software can be reliably released at any time and, following a pipeline through a "production-like environment", without doing so manually. It aims at building, testing, and releasing software with greater speed and frequency. The approach helps reduce the cost, time, and risk of delivering changes by allowing for more incremental updates to applications in production. A straightforward and repeatable deployment process is important for continuous delivery.

Continuous delivery contrasts with continuous deployment (also abbreviated CD), a similar approach in which software is also produced in short cycles but through automated deployments even to production rather than requiring a "click of a button" for that last step. As such, continuous deployment can be viewed as a more complete form of automation than continuous delivery.

Relationship to DevOps
Continuous delivery and DevOps are similar in their meanings and are often conflated, but they are two different concepts. DevOps has a broader scope, and centers around cultural change, specifically the collaboration of the various teams involved in software delivery (developers, operations, quality assurance, management, etc.), as well as automating the processes in software delivery. Continuous delivery, on the other hand, is an approach to automate the delivery aspect, and focuses on bringing together different processes and executing them more quickly and more frequently. Thus, DevOps can be a product of continuous delivery, and CD flows directly into DevOps.

Relationship to continuous deployment

Continuous delivery is the ability to deliver software that can be deployed at any time through manual releases; this is in contrast to continuous deployment which uses automated deployments. According to Martin Fowler, continuous deployment requires continuous delivery. Academic literature differentiates between the two approaches according to deployment method; manual vs. automated.

Principles 

Continuous delivery treats the commonplace notion of a deployment pipeline as a lean Poka-Yoke: a set of validations through which a piece of software must pass on its way to release. Code is compiled if necessary and then packaged by a build server every time a change is committed to a source control repository, then tested by a number of different techniques (possibly including manual testing) before it can be marked as releasable.

Developers used to a long cycle time may need to change their mindset when working in a CD environment. It is important to understand that any code commit may be released to customers at any point. Patterns such as feature toggles can be very useful for committing code early which is not yet ready for use by end users. Using NoSQL can eliminate the step of data migrations and schema changes, often manual steps or exceptions to a continuous delivery workflow. Other useful techniques for developing code in isolation such as code branching are not obsolete in a CD world, but must be adapted to fit the principles of CD - for example, running multiple long-lived code branches can prove impractical, as a releasable artifact must be built early in the CD process from a single code branch if it is to pass through all phases of the pipeline.

Deployment pipeline

Continuous delivery is enabled through the deployment pipeline. The purpose of the deployment pipeline has three components: visibility, feedback, and continually deploy.
Visibility – All aspects of the delivery system including building, deploying, testing, and releasing are visible to every member of the team to promote collaboration.
Feedback – Team members learn of problems as soon as possible when they occur so that they are able to fix them as quickly as possible. 
Continually deploy – Through a fully automated process, you can deploy and release any version of the software to any environment.

Tools/tool types

Continuous delivery takes automation from source control all the way through production. There are various tools that help accomplish all or part of this process. These tools are part of the deployment pipeline which includes continuous delivery. The types of tools that execute various parts of the process include: continuous integration, application release automation, build automation, application lifecycle management.

Architecting for continuous delivery
To practice continuous delivery effectively, software applications have to meet a set of architecturally significant requirements (ASRs) such as deployability, modifiability, and testability. These ASRs require a high priority and cannot be traded off lightly.

Microservices are often used when architecting for continuous delivery. The use of Microservices can increase a software system's deployability and modifiability. The observed deployability improvements include: deployment independence, shorter deployment time, simpler deployment procedures, and zero downtime deployment. The observed modifiability improvements include: shorter cycle time for small incremental functional changes, easier technology selection changes, incremental quality attribute changes, and easier language and library upgrades.

Implementation and usage 
The original CD book written by Jez Humble and David Farley (2010) popularized the term; however, since its creation the definition has continued to advance and now has a more developed meaning. Companies today are implementing these continuous delivery principles and best practices. The difference in domains, e.g. medical vs. web, is still significant and affects the implementation and usage. Well-known companies that have this approach include Yahoo!, Amazon, Facebook, Google, Paddy Power and Wells Fargo.

Benefits and obstacles 
Several benefits of continuous delivery have been reported.

 Accelerated time to market: Countinous delivery lets an organization deliver the business value inherent in new software releases to customers more quickly. This capability helps the company stay a step ahead of the competition.
 Building the right product: Frequent releases let the application development teams obtain user feedback more quickly. This lets them work on only the useful features. If they find that a feature isn't useful, they spend no further effort on it. This helps them build the right product.
 Improved productivity and efficiency: Significant time savings for developers, testers, operations engineers, etc. through automation.
 Reliable releases: The risks associated with a release have significantly decreased, and the release process has become more reliable. With countinous delivery, the deployment process and scripts are tested repeatedly before deployment to production. So, most errors in the deployment process and scripts have already been discovered. With more frequent releases, the number of code changes in each release decreases. This makes finding and fixing any problems that do occur easier, reducing the time in which they have an impact.
 Improved product quality: The number of open bugs and production incidents has decreased significantly.
 Improved customer satisfaction: A higher level of customer satisfaction is achieved.

Obstacles have also been investigated.
 Customer preferences: Some customers do not want continuous updates to their systems. This is especially true at the critical stages of their operations.
 Domain restrictions: In some domains, such as telecom and medical, regulations require extensive testing before new versions are allowed to enter the operations phase.
 Lack of test automation: Lack of test automation leads to a lack of developer confidence and can prevent using continuous delivery.
 Differences in environments: Different environments used in the development, testing and production can result in undetected issues slipping to the production environment.
 Tests needing a human oracle: Not all quality attributes can be verified with automation. These attributes require humans in the loop, slowing down the delivery pipeline.

Eight further adoption challenges were raised and elaborated on by Chen. These challenges are in the areas of organizational structure, processes, tools, infrastructure, legacy systems, architecting for countinous delivery, continuous testing of non-functional requirements, and test execution optimization.

Strategies to overcome adoption challenges 

Several strategies to overcome continuous delivery adoption challenges have been reported.

See also

 Application lifecycle management
 Application release automation
 Build management
 Change management
 CI/CD
 Continuous configuration automation
 Continuous delivery practices
 Continuous integration
 Continuous testing
 DevOps
 Release management
 Software configuration management
 Version control
 WinOps

Further reading

References 

Software release
Software design
Software development process